The 1961–62 A Group was the 14th season of the A Football Group, the top Bulgarian professional league for association football clubs, since its establishment in 1948.

Overview
It was contested by 14 teams, and CSKA Sofia won the championship.

League standings

Results

Champions
CSKA Sofia

Top scorers

References

External links
Bulgaria - List of final tables (RSSSF)
1961–62 Statistics of A Group at a-pfg.com

First Professional Football League (Bulgaria) seasons
Bulgaria
1961–62 in Bulgarian football